Thomas Muster was the defending champion but chose to compete at the Summer Olympics in Barcelona, losing in the first round.

Karel Nováček won the title by defeating Francisco Clavet 7–5, 6–2 in the final.

Seeds

Draw

Finals

Top half

Bottom half

References

External links
 Official results archive (ATP)
 Official results archive (ITF)

San Marino CEPU Open
1992 ATP Tour